The Royal Commonwealth Ex-Services League (RCEL) represents the interests of Commonwealth citizens who have served with either the British or Commonwealth Forces. It was founded in 1921 (as the British Empire Service League) by Field Marshals Earl Haig and Jan Smuts to link together the various ex-service organisations throughout the Commonwealth.

History 
The archives of the League are retained at its headquarters in London (UK). The papers include minutes of the Council from 1952 onwards and those of the Executive Committee; reports of the Triennial Conference since 1921; annual audited accounts; and subject and correspondence files referring to individual ex-servicemen's organisations in various countries. A full set of the magazine Our Empire is also available. Special permission is required for access to the papers and further enquiries should be addressed to the Secretary-General.

See also 
British Empire
Commonwealth of Nations
Commonwealth War Graves Commission
Remembrance Day

Notes

References

External links 
RCEL: For Service And Honour by Jennifer Morse published in Legion Magazine, 1 November 2008.

1921 establishments in the United Kingdom
Aftermath of World War I in the United Kingdom
Commonwealth Family
International organisations based in London
Organizations established in 1921
Veterans' affairs in Australia
Veterans' affairs in Canada
Veterans' affairs in South Africa
Veterans' affairs in the United Kingdom
Veterans' organizations